The 1986 Yugoslavian motorcycle Grand Prix was the fifth round of the 1986 Grand Prix motorcycle racing season. It took place on the weekend of 26–28 June 1986 at the Automotodrom Rijeka.

Classification

500 cc

References

Yugoslav motorcycle Grand Prix
Yugoslavian
Motorcycle Grand Prix
Yugoslavian motorcycle Grand Prix